Loras College is a private Catholic college in Dubuque, Iowa.  It has an enrollment of approximately 1,600 students and is the oldest post-secondary institution in the state of Iowa. The school offers both undergraduate and graduate degree programs. It is one of four four-year post-secondary institutions in the City of Dubuque, one of four Catholic colleges in the Archdiocese of Dubuque, and one of six Catholic colleges in the state of Iowa. The campus was listed on the National Register of Historic Places as the Loras College Historic District in 2020.

History
Loras College, a liberal arts college, was founded in 1839 by Mathias Loras, first bishop of Dubuque, who established Saint Raphael's Seminary to educate young men for the priesthood with the expressed intention of also providing an opportunity for higher education to the citizens of the area. Loras later became President of the college.  His statue on campus was removed on September 8, 2020 after it was discovered he was a slave owner  from 1836 to 1852.  The college has functioned under several different names: Saint Raphael's Seminary and later Saint Raphael's Academy (1839–1850), Mount St. Bernard's College and Seminary (1850–1873), St. Joseph's College (1873–1914), Dubuque College (1914–1920), and Columbia College (1920–1939).   The present name was adopted during the school's centennial in 1939.  That same year, the national Catholic honor society, Delta Epsilon Sigma was founded at the college, by Father Fitzgerald. From the time of its founding, the college has devoted its faculty and facilities to an undergraduate program; it conferred the Bachelor of Arts and Bachelor of Science degrees.

In 1963, when The Catholic University of America decided to discontinue its branch program of graduate study on the Loras campus, Loras College, realizing the growing need in the locale for study beyond the baccalaureate degree, initiated its Graduate Division offering the Master of Arts degree in some fields.

The College became coeducational in the fall of 1971. In 1973, the Associate of Arts and the Associate of Science degrees were introduced. The Division of Community Education was initiated in 1975.

Both the Undergraduate College and the Graduate Division of Loras College are accredited by the North Central Association of Colleges and Schools. The teacher education program, both at the graduate and undergraduate level, is accredited by the Iowa Department of Education. The undergraduate teacher education program is also accredited by the National Council for Accreditation of Teacher Education. The American Chemical Society has approved the undergraduate chemistry program. The Council of Social Work Education has accredited the social work major at the baccalaureate level.

Academics
Loras offers 49 majors, 11 stand-alone minors, and nine pre-professional programs for undergraduates. Undergraduates can also participate in summer classes, internships, field experience, study abroad, and other programs.

For graduate programs, Loras offers a Master of Arts in clinical or general psychology, school counseling, education STEM, and a master's degree Business Administration with a focus on business analytics.

Athletics
Loras’ athletic teams are known as the Duhawks, a name bestowed upon the football team by a Detroit Free Press scribe in 1924 converging Dubuque and Hawks. The school fields 23 men's and women's varsity teams in the NCAA Division III. They are a member of the American Rivers Conference (ARC), Midwest Women's Lacrosse Conference (MWLC), and the Midwest Collegiate Volleyball League (MCVL). Loras’ colors are Purple, Rah Rah Gold, and Metallic Gold. The men's soccer team has advanced to the NCAA Division III Final Four five times since 2007, and once to the NCAA Division III Championship game in 2015. Denise Udelhofen ('90) serves as the Director of Athletics for the Duhawks and is assisted by head men's soccer coach and Director of Soccer Operations, Dan Rothert ('96). Jim Naprstek ('13) serves as the Director of Athletic Communications for the Duhawks after his hiring in March 2014.

Campus

Loras sits on a  campus located atop several hills in Dubuque. The grounds are bounded by Loras Boulevard on the south, Kirkwood Street on the north, Henion Street on the east, and Alta Vista Street on the west. The campus is surrounded by residential neighborhoods on all sides, some of which are among the most historic in the city. The college consists of 23 buildings, 2 athletic fields, a stadium, and 5 tennis courts. Because of its high location, several of the buildings provide excellent views of Downtown Dubuque and the Mississippi River.

Some of the more notable buildings include:
 Athletic Wellness Center: Built in 2007–2008, the athletic wellness center provides a home to the men's and women's basketball teams as well as the men's and women's volleyball team, as well as men's wrestling. In addition, a cardio-vascular center, upgraded weight room and training room, as well as state-of-the-art locker rooms makes the 'AWC' a great improvement from "The Fieldhouse."

 Academic Resource Center: The ARC is home to the campus' main library, including some 355,000 items. The building also includes the bookstore, and other academic uses.

 Alumni Campus Center: At the center of campus, the Alumni Campus Center is a multi-function building, and includes the student union, dining hall, and meeting rooms.
 Christ the King Chapel: The main chapel on campus, built in 1946, is decorated in a pre-Vatican II Streamline Moderne architectural style. The chapel holds daily Mass, Thursday night Exposition of the Blessed Sacrament and Reconciliation, and Mass Sunday night with student lectors, cantors, musicians, extraordinary ministers of Holy Communion, greeters, acolytes, and sacristans. The building connects to Keane Hall via a skywalk between the two buildings. The chapel is also the final resting place of Father Aloysius Schmitt, the first chaplain killed during World War II.

 Hoffmann Hall: Hoffmann Hall is Loras' oldest standing building, with parts of the building built in 1902. It includes a tall clock tower, and houses various academic uses, a beautiful pre-Vatican II architectural-themed adoration chapel named St. Joseph's, along with St. Joseph's Auditorium.  The auditorium is the home of the Loras Players, the oldest continually running theater group west of the Mississippi River.  The stage in the auditorium features a turntable.

 Keane Hall: Keane Hall is the most visible building on campus, sitting at the peak of the highest hill in the city. Designed by celebrated architect Emmanuel Louis Masqueray, the building is multi-use, and includes administrative offices, academics, and faculty offices.
 The Visitation Complex: The Visitation is the former convent of the Visitation Sisters that now houses the school's classes in art and music. Gallagher Hall is where most recitals take place, and the building houses an art museum and practice space for musicians.

Expansion
The college has been expanded over the years. The Alumni Campus Center was built in 1992, and added a new library in 2001. The Academic Resource Center contains a collection of approximately 355,000 items and 11,000 magazine subscriptions. In addition to its broad general collection, the library contains a rich heritage in its special collections of rare books, as well as the photographs and manuscripts in the Center for Dubuque History located in the lower level of the library. The library is also an official document depository for both the United States government and the state of Iowa. The previous library, Wahlert Memorial Library, was remodeled into classroom space.

The college has purchased Cox Street which runs through campus from the city of Dubuque for $50,000. The school has since shut the street down and replaced it with a pedestrian friendly walk way to improve pedestrian safety and help upgrade the area aesthetically. In 2015, a school spirit shop, The Duhawk Shop, and Einstein Bros. Bagels opened at the corner of Loras Boulevard and the new Loras Parkway.

St. Pius X Seminary
St. Pius X Seminary is run under the auspices of the Archdiocese of Dubuque.  The seminary prepares Minor (College) Seminarians for the priesthood, specifically preparing candidates for entrance into Major Seminary & Theological studies.  Through Loras, the seminary provides full training in Philosophical studies, while giving students the necessary religious studies courses required for entrance into Major Seminary.  The seminary has operated under various names and conditions at Loras College since 1839 until adopting its present name in 1954.  St. Pius X has prepared countless Seminarians across Iowa & surrounding states for the priesthood, counting over 30 Bishops as alumni.  Currently, the seminary is housed at the Vianney House and serves Seminarians of the Archdiocese of Dubuque and the Diocese of Des Moines. The current rector of St. Pius X Seminary is Fr. David Schatz and the spiritual director is Fr. Tom McDermott.

Alumni and faculty

Loras College currently counts over 30 bishops as alumni.
Notable graduates and faculty of Loras College include:
 Don Ameche, film actor, known to have attended during the 1920s.
 Bill Bartmann (class of 1972), CEO of CFS2 and Nobel Peace Prize nominee for 2014
 Rod Blum (class of 1977), former U.S. congressman from Iowa's 1st District, 2015–2019
 Robert Byrne (author) - novelist and Billiard Congress of America Hall of Fame instructor of pool and carom billiards.
 Red Faber, Hall of Fame baseball pitcher, attended Loras in 1909. Faber set a college record by striking out 24 St. Ambrose University batters in a 1909 game before moving on to a 20-year Major League career with the Chicago White Sox. Faber-Clark Field on Loras’ lower campus bears his name today.
 Matthew Fox, Creation Spirituality founder attended Loras in 1958. He was eventually ordained as a Dominican priest but then silenced for a year (forbidden to teach theology) by Cardinal Ratzinger (later Pope Benedict XVI) of the Holy See in 1988. In 1993, he was expelled from the Dominican order and effectively from the Catholic Church at the order of Cardinal Ratzinger. In 1994, he became an Episcopal priest.
 Edward Grace (class of 1988), Chief of Law Enforcement for the United States Fish and Wildlife Service. In 2016, he received the Service to America Medal for stopping an international Rhino and Elephant poaching and wildlife smuggling network.
 Greg Gumbel (class of 1967), CBS sportscaster
 George Guthridge, award-winning speculative fiction author; taught English at Loras and brought George R. R. Martin to nearby Clarke College
 Chris Jans (class of 1991), head coach of the Mississippi State University men's basketball team
 Pam Jochum (class of 1992), Iowa State Senator and first woman to hold the title of Senate President
 Darin LaHood (class of 1990), current U.S. congressman from Illinois's 18th District, 2015–present
 Bill Lipinski, former U.S. congressman from Illinois's 5th District (1983-1993) and 3rd District (1993-2005), attended 1956-1957
 Javier Manzano (class of 1998), freelance photographer, who received the Public Photo Prize Award at the 20th edition of the Bayeux Calvados Awards held in Bayeux, France. In 2013, he received the Pulitzer Prize for feature photography for his photo of two rebel soldiers guarding their sniper's nest in Aleppo, Syria.
 Mickey Marty (class of 1949), All-American basketball player.
 Michael M. Mihm (class of 1964), U.S. District Court Judge for the Central District of Illinois.
 Robert W. Pratt (class of 1969), District Judge for the United States District Court for the Southern District of Iowa
 John Joseph Paul (class of 1939), Roman Catholic Bishop of the Diocese of La Crosse.
 Frank Quilici, Professional Baseball Player for Minnesota Twins.
 David Rabe (class of 1962), playwright and screenwriter.
 Raymond Roseliep (class of 1939), American poet famous for haiku.
 Father Aloysius Schmitt, one of those killed on board the USS Oklahoma during the Japanese attack on Pearl Harbor on December 7, 1941. He was the first chaplain killed during World War II.
 Dennis Schmitz, contemporary American poet.
 Thomas P. Sullivan (class of 1951), trial lawyer, former U.S. Attorney under President Jimmy Carter
 Thomas Tauke (class of 1972), U.S. congressman from Iowa, 1979–1991.

See also
 Dubuque, Iowa
 Roman Catholic Archdiocese of Dubuque
 St. Pius X Seminary (Dubuque, Iowa)

References

External links

 Official website
 Official athletics website

 
Education in Dubuque, Iowa
Roman Catholic Archdiocese of Dubuque
Liberal arts colleges in Iowa
Educational institutions established in 1839
Buildings and structures in Dubuque, Iowa
Tourist attractions in Dubuque, Iowa
Catholic universities and colleges in Iowa
National Register of Historic Places in Dubuque, Iowa
University and college buildings on the National Register of Historic Places in Iowa
Historic districts on the National Register of Historic Places in Iowa